James Figgins (16 April 1811 – 12 June 1884) was an English Conservative politician who sat in the House of Commons from 1868 to 1874.

Figgins was the son of Vincent Figgins of Peckham Rye and his wife Elizabeth. He was educated by Dr Brown, of Esher and went into business as a type-founder. He was a J.P. for Middlesex and was Sheriff of London and Middlesex from 1865 to 1866.
 
At the 1868 general election Figgins was elected Member of Parliament for Shrewsbury. He held the seat until 1874.

Figgins married Louisa Beckwith, daughter of W. A. Beckwith of Skinner Street, in 1836.

Figgins died at the age of 73 and is buried with his father and brother in Nunhead Cemetery.

References

External links

1811 births
1884 deaths
Conservative Party (UK) MPs for English constituencies
UK MPs 1868–1874
Members of the Metropolitan Board of Works
Sheriffs of the City of London
Burials at Nunhead Cemetery